La Vida Lena  is a Philippine television drama broadcast by Kapamilya Channel, A2Z and TV5. The fast-cut version was released from November 14, 2020 to January 16, 2021 on iWantTFC. The full series aired from June 28, 2021 to February 4, 2022 on the channel's Primetime Bida evening block and worldwide via The Filipino Channel.

Series overview

 iWantTFC shows two episodes first in advance before its television broadcast starting with the second season.

Episodes

Fast cut (2020–2021)

TV broadcast (2021)

Season 2

Season 3

References

Lists of Philippine drama television series episodes